Isfahan Police Department is a police agency in Isfahan. In 2020 Isfahan Cyber Police's new building was opened.

In 2014 Isfahan police is of Isfahan Province ranked first among the Iran's police departments.
In 2020 Chief of the provincial police is Second Brigadier General Mohammadreza Mir Heidari appointed by Hossein Ashtari.

Administration

List of police stations

See also

Judicial system of Iran

Further reading
(Persian) Selection of eloquent officers for Isfahan police stations

References

External links
http://news.police.ir/News/subService.do?Serv=36&SGr=70&Servic=%D8%A7%D8%B5%D9%81%D9%87%D8%A7%D9%86 

Isfahan
Law enforcement agencies of Iran